Ian O'Connor (born June 18, 1987) is an American professional ice hockey player. An unrestricted free agent, he last played for the Manchester Monarchs of the American Hockey League.

Career
On March 18, 2011, the Reading Royals of the ECHL signed O'Connor to an amateur tryout agreement. During the 2012–13 season, O'Connor was loaned by the Royals to the Manchester Monarchs of the American Hockey League.

References

External links

1987 births
Living people
Manchester Monarchs (AHL) players
Providence Friars men's ice hockey players
Reading Royals players
St. John's IceCaps players
Stockton Thunder players
Worcester Sharks players
American men's ice hockey forwards